Eastern Goleta Valley is a census-designated place (CDP) in Santa Barbara County, California, United States. It is located between Goleta to the west, Santa Barbara to the east, the Pacific Ocean to the south, and the Santa Ynez Mountains to the north. It was first listed as a CDP prior to the 2020 census.

Demographics

References 

Census-designated places in Santa Barbara County, California
Census-designated places in California